"Young & Free" is a single recorded by South Korean singers Xiumin and Mark, members of K-pop groups EXO and NCT respectively. It was released by S.M. Entertainment and distributed by Genie Music on July 7, 2017 through their digital music project SM Station.

Background and release 
On June 28, S.M. Entertainment announced that Xiumin and Mark will collaborate for an SM Station track "Young & Free" set to be released on July 7. The agency also released a video clip of the two introducing their track "Young & Free" on their official Twitter page. On June 30, S.M. stated that the duo would be performing the song live during the SMTOWN concert that is set to take place on July 8. On the same day, teaser photos of the duo were released through S.M.'s official Twitter page. One July 5, an interview video of the duo talking about their collaboration and their friendship was released. A teaser of the music video was released on July 6. On July 7, the song along with the official music video were released.

Produced by Willie Weeks, "Young & Free" is described as a 90's vibe song featuring retro piano tunes and future-bass sounds, "Young & Free" is altogether a lively tune that features Xiumin's singing and Mark's rapping. The song's lyrics talk about how to live in the moment.

Music video 
Released on July 7, the music video of "Young & Free" features Xiumin and Mark at what appears as a photographic studio playing around and dancing "freely". At the end of the music video the duo end up in a real forest.

Track listing

Charts

Weekly charts

Monthly charts

Sales

Release history

References 

2017 songs
2017 singles
Korean-language songs
SM Entertainment singles
Songs written by Andreas Öberg
Future bass songs
Songs written by Drew Ryan Scott